Peter and the Commissar is a 1964 musical comedy album by Allan Sherman, recorded live with Arthur Fiedler conducting the Boston Pops Orchestra and five guest jazz musicians. The title track pokes fun at communism in the Soviet Union, and is a spoof of Peter and the Wolf by Sergei Prokofiev, with original spoken rhymed verse by Sherman.

Track listing

Side One
 "Peter and the Commissar" (24:16)

Side Two
 "Introduction" (3:10)
 "Variations On How Dry I Am" (9:28) (hiccups solo by Arthur Fiedler)
 "The End Of A Symphony" (8:00)
 

1964 albums
Allan Sherman albums
Albums conducted by Arthur Fiedler
RCA Victor albums
Collectors' Choice Music albums
Musical parodies
1960s comedy albums